Vojtěch Vorel (born 18 June 1996) is a Czech footballer who plays for Sparta Prague as a goalkeeper.

Club career
Vorel made his professional Fortuna Liga debut for Senica against ViOn Zlaté Moravce on 18 May 2019.

References

External links
 FK Senica official club profile 
 Futbalnet profile 
 
 

1996 births
Living people
Czech footballers
Czech expatriate footballers
Czech Republic youth international footballers
Czech Republic under-21 international footballers
Association football goalkeepers
AC Sparta Prague players
FC Sellier & Bellot Vlašim players
FK Senica players
SK Dynamo České Budějovice players
Czech National Football League players
Slovak Super Liga players
Czech First League players
Expatriate footballers in Slovakia
Czech expatriate sportspeople in Slovakia
Footballers from Prague